The term Barque of St. Peter or Ship/Boat of St. Peter or Barque of the Church, symbolises the Roman Catholic Church as a barque. The symbolism refers to St. Peter, the first Pope, a fisherman who became one of the 12 Apostles of Jesus. The Roman Catholic Church believes the role of St. Peter and the Pope as  his successor is steering the Barque of the Church towards the port of salvation/heaven. The symbolism may explain the etymology of the naming of the central part of churches as nave, which stems from the Latin word for ship navis.

History 
The imagery of the Barque of St. Peter holds biblical ties to Noah's Ark as written in First Epistle of Peter 3:20-21 and Jesus calming the storm at the sea of Galilee as written in Mark 4:35-41.

Catholicism 

150-240 AD Tertullian "the founder of Western theology" referred to the Church as a ship in De Baptismo (On Baptism):"...the apostles then served the turn of baptism whenin their little ship, were sprinkled and covered with the waves: that Peter himself also was immersed enough when he walked on the sea."[8] It is, however, as I think, one thing to be sprinkled or intercepted by the violence of the sea; another thing to be baptized in obedience to the discipline of religion. But that little ship did present a figure of the Church, in that she is disquieted "in the sea," that is, in the world,[9] "by the waves," that is, by persecutions and temptations; the Lord, through patience, sleeping as it were, until, roused in their last extremities by the prayers of the saints, He checks the world,[10] and restores tranquility to His own."c. 195 AD Clement of Alexandria approved the use of a ship as a symbol for signet rings in the third book of The Paedagogus: "...let our seals be either a dove, or a fish, or a ship scudding before the wind, or a musical lyre, which Polycrates used, or a ship's anchor, which Seleucus got engraved as a device; and if there be one fishing, he will remember the apostle, and the children drawn out of the water." 
375 to 380 AD In the book II of the Apostolic Constitutions:"When you call an assembly of the Church as one that is the commander of a great ship, appoint the assemblies to be made with all possible skill, charging the deacons as mariners to prepare places for the brethren as for passengers, with all due care and decency. And first, let the building be long, with its head to the east, with its vestries on both sides at the east end, and so it will be like a ship. In the middle let the bishop's throne be placed, and on each side of him let the presbytery sit down; and let the deacons stand near at hand, in close and small girt garments, for they are like the mariners and managers of the ship" 
1298 AD The Bark of St. Peter (mosaic), commonly known as the Navicella, by Giotto is commissioned for the Old Saint Peter's Basilica in Rome.

1241 AD Pope Gregory IX or Pope Innocent IV in response to the destruction of the Genoese fleet in the Battle of Giglio:

 Niteris incassum navem submergere Petri / Fluctuat at numquam mergitur illa ratis.
 "In vain you strive to submerge the ship of Peter — this vessel rocks but is never submerged."

This distich would inspire the motto of Paris and be featured on Paris' coat of arms.

1596 AD In the Volume XII of the Annales Ecclesiastici historian Cardinal Baronius writes on the condition of the Irish Church in 566 AD:"...having made shipwreck in consequence of not following the Barque of St. Peter"

Eastern Orthodox 

The Eastern Orthodox Church utilises the similar Ark of Salvation in its iconography as a representation of the Church.

Islam 
In Islam, the Hadith known as the Hadith of the Ark a ship is similarly used to symbolise the only way to salvation. In it the prophet Muhammad compares his Ahl al-Bayt, his household, to Noah's ark as the only way to salvation. The Hadith is as follows:Behold! The similitude of my Ahlul Bayt, is like that of the Ark of Noah: The one who embarks it, will have saved himself, and the one who turns away from it, is doomed.

Modern usage

Coat of Arms 

 Archdiocese of Vancouver
 City of Paris

Flags 

 Flag of Paris

Coelum Stellatum Christianum 
1627 AD Julius Schiller in his book Coelum Stellatum Christianum attempted to Christianise the constellations. Schiller depicted Ursa Major as the Barque of St. Peter.

References 

History of the Catholic Church
Barques